976 Benjamina (prov. designation:  or ) is a dark background asteroid from the outer regions of the asteroid belt, approximately  in diameter. It was discovered on 27 March 1922, by Russian-French astronomer Benjamin Jekhowsky at the Algiers Observatory in North Africa. The large X/D-type asteroid has a rotation period of 9.7 hours and is likely regular in shape. It was named after the discoverer's son.

Orbit and classification 

Benjamina is a non-family asteroid of the main belt's background population when applying the hierarchical clustering method to its proper orbital elements. It orbits the Sun in the outer main-belt at a distance of 2.9–3.5 AU once every 5 years and 9 months (2,092 days; semi-major axis of 3.2 AU). Its orbit has an eccentricity of 0.10 and an inclination of 8° with respect to the ecliptic.

The body's observation arc begins at the Crimean Simeiz Observatory in September 1930, more than 7 years after its official discovery observation at Algiers Observatory in March 1922.

Naming 

This minor planet was named after Benjamin Jekhowsky Jr., son of discoverer Benjamin Jekhowsky. The  was mentioned in The Names of the Minor Planets by Paul Herget in 1955.

Physical characteristics 

In the Tholen classification, and based on a noisy spectra, Benjamina is an X-type asteroid, somewhat similar to that of a dark D-type (XD), which are common in the outer asteroid belt and among the Jupiter trojan population.

Rotation period and pole 

In September 2004, a rotational lightcurve of Benjamina was obtained from photometric observations by French amateur astronomer Laurent Bernasconi. Lightcurve analysis gave a well-defined rotation period of  hours with a brightness variation of  magnitude. Follow-up observation by his college René Roy in March 2018, determined a concurring period of  hours but with a much higher amplitude of  magnitude. The objects first lightcurve was obtained by Colin Bembrick at Mount Tarana Observatory  in Australia in March 2003. It showed a period of  hours with an amplitude of  magnitude. The overall amplitude suggest a rather regular shape with a ratio of 0.86 for the length of the a and b axes.

In 2018, Czech astronomers Josef Ďurech and Josef Hanuš published a modeled lightcurve using photometric data from the Gaia probe's second data release. It showed a sidereal period of  hours, and gave a spin axis at (354.0°, 80.0°) in ecliptic coordinates (λ, β).

Diameter and albedo 

The Collaborative Asteroid Lightcurve Link adopts the result from IRAS, that is, an albedo of 0.0559 and a diameter of 80.53 kilometers based on an absolute magnitude of 9.22.

The asteroid had been observed in 7 stellar occultation events since 2003. On 19 July 2003 the mag. 5.7 star HIP 88816 was occulted by the asteroid, and was observed at 11 stations; 1 in Argentina, 3 in New Zealand, and 7 in Australia. From these observations, the best-fit ellipse measures 85.2 x 56.2 +/-12.4 kilometres.

References

External links 
 Lightcurve Database Query (LCDB), at www.minorplanet.info
 Dictionary of Minor Planet Names, Google books
 Asteroids and comets rotation curves, CdR – Geneva Observatory, Raoul Behrend
 Discovery Circumstances: Numbered Minor Planets (1)-(5000) – Minor Planet Center
 
 

000976
Discoveries by Benjamin Jekhowsky
Named minor planets
000976
19220327